Santander de Quilichao is a town and municipality in the north of the Cauca Department, Colombia at 97 km to the north of Popayán and 45 km to the south of Cali.

References

External links
 Santander de Quilichao official website

Municipalities of Cauca Department